Virendra K Baranwal is an Indian academic, scientist and agricultural researcher.

Personal life
Baranwal was born on 10 July 1960 in Deoria, Uttar Pradesh. He was educated at Maharaja Agrasen Inter College in Deoria. Baranwal archived B.Sc., M.Sc. and Ph.D. degree in Lucknow University.

Selected bibliography

Books

Awards and honors
 DBT Overseas Fellowship, Secretary - 2000
 Indian Virological Society, Member - 2008
 Technical expert committee - 2010
 National Certification System for Tissue Cultured Plants - 2015
 University of Florida, USA - 2010

References

Indian agriculturalists
Indian scientific authors
Fellows of The National Academy of Sciences, India
1960 births
Living people
Indian virologists